Ruslan Shishikhin (born 1989), known as The Yudino Maniac, is a Russian serial killer who murdered two women and a young girl in Kazan between 2006 and 2007. Following his arrest, Shishikin was brought to trial, but was found to be unfit to stand trial and instead send to an undisclosed psychiatric facility.

Biography

Early life
Little is known about Shishikhin's upbringing. Born in Kazan in 1989, he began showing signs of a mental illness at an early age, and because of this, he was repeatedly examined at various mental institutions and consulted by psychiatrists. Despite this, his condition didn't improve, and over the years, neighbors of the Shishikhin family frequently reported how he would attack his stepfather with a knife. As a result, his parents rented another apartment in the same building, and left him to live on his own. Not long after, Shishikhin began to hear voices in his head, which instructed him to attack bystanders on the street, and thus, a series of murders occurred in Kazan.

Murders
On September 17, 2006, the 17-year-old Shishikhin grabbed a knife and began roaming the streets of Kazan, finding himself in the Yudino microdistrict. On Revolutsionnay Street, he came across 27-year-old Natalya Obrubova, who was walking with her child. To the shock of nearby passengers, Shishikhin lunged at her and stabbed the woman through the heart with the knife without saying a word, killing her on the spot. After killing Obrubova, he quickly ran away from the scene. While several people attempted to catch up to him, he managed to get away.

Shishikhin struck again on January 12, 2007, when he attacked 45-year-old Milyausha Makarova, an employee at the Federal Penitentiary Service, near Serov Street in Kazan. He raped her and then stabbed her to death with the same knife he had killed Obrubova with, before fleeing the scene.

His final and most brutal murder occurred three months later in Yudino, on April 22. On that day, Shishikhin's 8-year-old neighbor, Anya Yurasova, was climbing up the stairs of their apartment building, because she was afraid of using the elevator by herself. When she reached the fourth floor, Shishikhin suddenly grabbed the girl and dragged her to his apartment, where he proceeded to sexually assault her. Then, he stabbed her a total of 112 times with his knife and hit her on the head with a blunt object, before finally cutting her throat near the entrance. After he had definitively killed the girl, Shishikhin left the body on the stairway between the third and fourth floors and returned to the apartment, where he proceeded to calmly clean up all of the blood. After he had finished, he left to visit his parents.

Arrest, trial and detention
In the meantime, a neighbor found the mutilated body and alerted the other residents, who in turn called the police. By the time the authorities had arrived, nearly everybody living in the apartment block - including Shishikhin - had gathered to learn what had transpired. The case was very quickly resolved, as the operatives had brought a police dog along with them, which quickly led to Shishikhin's apartment. While examining it, they noted the strong smell of bleach in the apartment, as well as the suspicious behavior of its owner. Finally, operatives found smeared blood stains on Shishikhin's bed, which proved to them that he was the likely killer. As a result, he was arrested on the spot and brought to the police station for further interrogation.

During said interrogation, Shishikhin explained that he had been hearing voices for some time, and that on this day, they had instructed him to kill little Anya. Much to the investigators' horror, he then calmly explained that he had committed the two previous murders, which until then had been considered separate cases. Shortly after these revelations, Shishikhin was ordered to stand trial, in spite of being registered at several psychiatric institutions and a preliminary examination diagnosing him with schizophrenia. In the end, he was deemed unfit to stand trial and incapable of understanding the gravity of his actions, and promptly transported to a psychiatric hospital in Kazan, which specializes in treating patients that are considered dangerous threats to those around them.

See also
 List of Russian serial killers

References

1989 births
21st-century Russian criminals
Living people
Male serial killers
People acquitted by reason of insanity
People from Kazan
People with schizophrenia
Prisoners and detainees of Russia
Russian male criminals
Russian murderers of children
Russian prisoners and detainees
Russian rapists
Russian serial killers